Lynn E. Lynch (born August 10, 1928) is a former American football guard who played for the Chicago Cardinals. He played college football at University of Illinois at Urbana–Champaign after attending Indianapolis Technical High School.

References

Living people
1928 births
American football offensive guards
Illinois Fighting Illini football players
Chicago Cardinals players
Players of American football from Indianapolis